Gilles Cardinet (born 18 March 1962) is a French former professional football player and manager.

References

External links 
 
 
 

1962 births
Living people
French footballers
French football managers
Sportspeople from Nièvre
Association football midfielders
Association football forwards
Paris Saint-Germain F.C. players
Stade Brestois 29 players
Valenciennes FC players
AS Poissy players
French Division 3 (1971–1993) players
Ligue 1 players
Ligue 2 players
French Division 4 (1978–1993) players
Footballers from Bourgogne-Franche-Comté